Oğuzlar District is a district of the Çorum Province of Turkey. Its seat is the town of Oğuzlar. Its area is 121 km2, and its population is 4,896 (2022).

Composition
There is one municipality in Oğuzlar District:
 Oğuzlar

There are 6 villages in Oğuzlar District:

 Ağaççamı
 Cevizli
 Derinöz
 Erenler
 Kayı
 Şaphane

References

Districts of Çorum Province